M. C. Veerabahu Pillai (19 May 1903 – 15 April 1976) was an Indian lawyer, businessman, and politician from Tamil Nadu, who served in the first Lok Sabha of independent India; he was also an independence activist.

Prior to Indian independence, Veerabahu sacrificed his law career to participate in Mahatma Gandhi's struggle. He was closely associated with stalwarts like Kamaraj and Rajaji. He actively worked  for removal of untouchability, prohibition and championed the cause of Scheduled Castes. He was a member of the Constituent Assembly and Provisional Parliament during 1946–1952.

Though he worked for Freedom fighter's pension, he never took any pension throughout his life. He managed his family expenses only from his ancestral property and income. He always worked for the social cause.

Early life
M. C. Veerabahu was born to M. Chidambaram Pillai and Gomathi Ammal at Thoothukudi on 19 May 1903. His family was involved in Export Business to Colombo. At a very early age, Veerabahu was involved in Indian Independence Movement.

Politics
M. C. Veerabahu was a Member of Constituent Assembly. He is the one signed in his mother tongue Tamil language in the original Constitution of India.

Notes

Indian National Congress politicians from Tamil Nadu
Lok Sabha members from Tamil Nadu
Members of the Constituent Assembly of India
Indian independence activists from Tamil Nadu
1903 births
1976 deaths